Solid Ground may refer to:
 Solid Ground (Seattle), a social service organization in Washington, U.S.

Albums
 Solid Ground (Gugun Blues Shelter album), 2011
 Solid Ground (John Anderson album), 1993
 Solid Ground (Peter Baldrachi album), 2006
 Solid Ground (Rob Crosby album), 1990
 Solid Ground (Smokie album), 1981
 Solid Ground (The Black Seeds album), 2008
 Solid Ground, by Wolf Mail, 2002
 Solid Ground, by Ronnie Laws, 1981

Songs
 "Solid Ground" (song), by Marit Larsen